Prayad Boonya (born November 15, 1979) is a Thai retired professional footballer who played as a centre-back.

International career

He was part of the 2012 AFF Suzuki Cup by the lead of Winfried Schäfer.

Honours
Ratchaburi
Thai Division 1 League: 2012 Champion

International goals

References

 
https://us.soccerway.com/players/prayat-bunya/276473/

1979 births
Living people
Prayad Boonya
Prayad Boonya
Prayad Boonya
Prayad Boonya
Prayad Boonya
Prayad Boonya
Prayad Boonya
Association football defenders